Geoffrey Basil Bailey Hunter (14 December 1925 – 8 June 2000) was a British professor, philosopher, and logician. Hunter was Professor Emeritus of the University College of Wales, Bangor where he was professor from 1978 until he retired in 1992. He also taught at Queen's University Kingston, Ontario (1950–1952) and was a lecturer in Philosophy at the University of Leeds (1952–1965), and reader in Logic at University of St Andrews (1965–1978). Geoffrey was probably most known for his work titled Metalogic: An Introduction to the Metatheory of Standard First-Order Logic published in 1971.

Published work 
Hunter, Geoffrey (1971). "Metalogic: An Introduction to the Metatheory of Standard First Order Logic". Macmillan
Hunter, Geoffrey (1973). "Not Both P and not Q, therefore if P then Q" is not a valid form of argument Mind vol LXXXII:280-280
Hunter, Geoffrey (1974). "Concepts and Meaning." in Hume and the Enlightenment: essays presented to Ernest Campbell Mossner / edited by William B. Todd
Hunter, Geoffrey (1980). "What do the Consistency Proofs for Non-Euclidean Geometry Prove?"  Analysis:40:79-83.
Hunter, Geoffrey (1988). "What Computers Can't Do" Philosophy:63:175-189.
Hunter, Geoffrey (1994). "Platonist Manifesto" Philosophy:69:151-62.
Hunter, Geoffrey (1995). "The Churchland's Eliminative Materialism : or the Result of Impatience."  Philosophical Investigations:18(1):13-30.
Hunter, Geoffrey (1995). "Quine's Two Dogmas of Empiricism'." Philosophical Investigations 18(4): 305-328.

See also 
Metalogic

References 

1925 births
2000 deaths
20th-century British philosophers
Academics of Bangor University
Academics of the University of Leeds
Academics of the University of St Andrews
British logicians
Academic staff of the Queen's University at Kingston